The Indigo Necklace (1945), also published as The Indigo Necklace Murders, is a mystery novel by Frances Crane.

Synopsis
While staying in an old New Orleans mansion, Pat Abbott overhears the disquieting sound of opening doors and stolen footsteps across the balcony outside his room, before discovering the ghostly white, robed body of a man in the adjoining courtyard. Against his will, he finds himself up against a serial murderer with experience in exotic poisons, and whose master plan somehow involves the titular Indigo necklace.

References

1945 American novels
American crime novels
Novels set in New Orleans
Random House books